A. meleagris may refer to:

 Acontias meleagris, a skink species in the genus Acontias
 Arothron meleagris, a pufferfish species